Jüri Marksoo (born Jüri Markson; 10 August 1876 Ertsma, Pärnu County – 3 October 1941 Sevurallag, Sverdlovsk Oblast) was an Estonian politician. He was a member of Estonian National Assembly.

References

1876 births
1941 deaths
Members of the Estonian National Assembly
Recipients of the Order of the White Star, 3rd Class
Gulag detainees
Estonian people who died in Soviet detention
People who died in the Gulag
People from Põhja-Pärnumaa Parish